Cut Knife is a former provincial electoral district  for the Legislative Assembly of the province of Saskatchewan, Canada. This constituency was created before the 4th Saskatchewan general election in 1917. Redrawn to include the former district of Lloydminster in 1934, the constituency was renamed "Cut Knife-Lloydminster" in 1964.

This district was dissolved before the 23rd Saskatchewan general election in 1995. It is now part of the Lloydminster and Cut Knife-Turtleford constituencies.

Members of the Legislative Assembly

Cut Knife (1917 – 1964)

Cut Knife-Lloydminster (1964 – 1995)

Election results

|-

 
|Conservative
|Samson J. Graham
|align="right"|657
|align="right"|45.12%
|align="right"|–
|- bgcolor="white"
!align="left" colspan=3|Total
!align="right"|1,456
!align="right"|100.00%
!align="right"|

|-

|Independent
|Tom C. Raymond
|align="right"|689
|align="right"|42.53%
|align="right"|–
|- bgcolor="white"
!align="left" colspan=3|Total
!align="right"|1,620
!align="right"|100.00%
!align="right"|

|-

|- bgcolor="white"
!align="left" colspan=3|Total
!align="right"|1,636
!align="right"|100.00%
!align="right"|

|-

|style="width: 130px"|Independent
|George John McLean
|align="right"|1,452
|align="right"|56.67%
|align="right"|-

|- bgcolor="white"
!align="left" colspan=3|Total
!align="right"|2,562
!align="right"|100.00%
!align="right"|

|-

|style="width: 130px"|Farmer-Labour
|Andrew James Macauley
|align="right"|3,268
|align="right"|46.13%
|align="right"|–

 
|Conservative
|George John McLean
|align="right"|1,099
|align="right"|15.51%
|align="right"|-41.16
|- bgcolor="white"
!align="left" colspan=3|Total
!align="right"|7,085
!align="right"|100.00%
!align="right"|

|-

 
|CCF
|Andrew James Macauley
|align="right"|1,766
|align="right"|26.69%
|align="right"|-19.44
|- bgcolor="white"
!align="left" colspan=3|Total
!align="right"|6,616
!align="right"|100.00%
!align="right"|

|-
 
|style="width: 130px"|CCF
|Isidore Nollet
|align="right"|2,726
|align="right"|59.97%
|align="right"|+33.28

|- bgcolor="white"
!align="left" colspan=3|Total
!align="right"|4,546
!align="right"|100.00%
!align="right"|

|-
 
|style="width: 130px"|CCF
|Isidore Nollet
|align="right"|3,027
|align="right"|48.82%
|align="right"|-11.15

|- bgcolor="white"
!align="left" colspan=3|Total
!align="right"|6,200
!align="right"|100.00%
!align="right"|

|-
 
|style="width: 130px"|CCF
|Isidore Nollet
|align="right"|3,598
|align="right"|52.69%
|align="right"|+3.87

|- bgcolor="white"
!align="left" colspan=3|Total
!align="right"|6,829
!align="right"|100.00%
!align="right"|

|-
 
|style="width: 130px"|CCF
|Isidore Nollet
|align="right"|3,338
|align="right"|50.70%
|align="right"|-1.99

|- bgcolor="white"
!align="left" colspan=3|Total
!align="right"|6,583
!align="right"|100.00%
!align="right"|

|-
 
|style="width: 130px"|CCF
|Isidore Nollet
|align="right"|2,396
|align="right"|42.38%
|align="right"|-8.32

 
|Prog. Conservative
|Charles W. Taylor
|align="right"|785
|align="right"|13.88%
|align="right"|-

|- bgcolor="white"
!align="left" colspan=3|Total
!align="right"|5,654
!align="right"|100.00%
!align="right"|

Cut Knife-Lloydminster (1964 – 1995)

|-
 
|style="width: 130px"|CCF
|Isidore Nollet
|align="right"|2,927
|align="right"|45.99%
|align="right"|+3.61

 
|Prog. Conservative
|Gordon Goodfellow
|align="right"|1,617
|align="right"|25.40%
|align="right"|+11.52
|- bgcolor="white"
!align="left" colspan=3|Total
!align="right"|6,365
!align="right"|100.00%
!align="right"|

|-
 
|style="width: 130px"|NDP
|Miro Kwasnica
|align="right"|2,862
|align="right"|44.47%
|align="right"|-1.52

 
|Prog. Conservative
|Gordon Goodfellow
|align="right"|1,289
|align="right"|20.03%
|align="right"|-5.37

|- bgcolor="white"
!align="left" colspan=3|Total
!align="right"|6,436
!align="right"|100.00%
!align="right"|

|-
 
|style="width: 130px"|NDP
|Miro Kwasnica
|align="right"|3,748
|align="right"|59.59%
|align="right"|+15.12

|- bgcolor="white"
!align="left" colspan=3|Total
!align="right"|6,290
!align="right"|100.00%
!align="right"|

|-
 
|style="width: 130px"|NDP
|Miro Kwasnica
|align="right"|2,794
|align="right"|40.01%
|align="right"|-19.58
 
|Prog. Conservative
|Fred Baynton
|align="right"|2,113
|align="right"|30.26%
|align="right"|-

|- bgcolor="white"
!align="left" colspan=3|Total
!align="right"|6,983
!align="right"|100.00%
!align="right"|

|-
 
|style="width: 130px"|NDP
|Robert Long
|align="right"|3,828
|align="right"|52.44%
|align="right"|+12.43
 
|Prog. Conservative
|Bob Kent
|align="right"|3,213
|align="right"|44.01%
|align="right"|+13.75

|- bgcolor="white"
!align="left" colspan=3|Total
!align="right"|7,300
!align="right"|100.00%
!align="right"|

|-
 
|style="width: 130px"|Progressive Conservative
|Michael Hopfner
|align="right"|4,968
|align="right"|54.95%
|align="right"|+10.94
 
|NDP
|Robert Long
|align="right"|3,963
|align="right"|43.84%
|align="right"|-8.60

|- bgcolor="white"
!align="left" colspan=3|Total
!align="right"|9,040
!align="right"|100.00%
!align="right"|

|-
 
|style="width: 130px"|Progressive Conservative
|Michael Hopfner
|align="right"|4,526
|align="right"|52.32%
|align="right"|-2.63
 
|NDP
|Robert Long
|align="right"|3,677
|align="right"|42.50%
|align="right"|-1.34

|- bgcolor="white"
!align="left" colspan=3|Total
!align="right"|8,651
!align="right"|100.00%
!align="right"|

|-
 
|style="width: 130px"|NDP
|Violet Stanger
|align="right"|3,843
|align="right"|47.59%
|align="right"|+5.09
 
|Prog. Conservative
|Michael Hopfner
|align="right"|2,899
|align="right"|35.90%
|align="right"|-16.42

|- bgcolor="white"
!align="left" colspan=3|Total
!align="right"|8,075
!align="right"|100.00%
!align="right"|

See also
Electoral district (Canada)
List of Saskatchewan provincial electoral districts
List of Saskatchewan general elections
List of political parties in Saskatchewan
R.M. of Cut Knife No. 439

References
 Saskatchewan Archives Board – Saskatchewan Election Results By Electoral Division

Former provincial electoral districts of Saskatchewan
Cut Knife No. 439, Saskatchewan